Derek Bell may refer to:

Sports

 Derek Bell (baseball) (born 1968), American baseball player
 Derek Bell (footballer, born 1956), English former professional footballer
 Derek Bell (footballer, born 1963), English former professional footballer
 Derek Bell (racing driver) (born 1941), British racing car driver

Other
 Derek Bell (musician) (1935–2002), Northern Irish musician and composer
 Derek Bell (physician), professor of acute medicine

See also
 Derrick Bell (1930–2011), American lawyer, professor, and civil rights activist